Graeme Smith (born 31 March 1976 in Falkirk, Scotland, UK) is a former British freestyle swimmer.

Swimming career
He swam for Great Britain at the 1996, 2000 and 2004 Olympics. At the 1996 Olympics, he garnered the bronze medal in the 1500m Freestyle.

He swam for Great Britain (or Scotland as noted) at the:
Olympics: 1996, 2000, 2004
World Championships: 1998, 2001, 2003
Commonwealth Games (Scotland): 1994, 1998, 2002
European Championships: 1995, 1997
Short Course Worlds: 1993, 1997, 1999
Short Course Europeans: 1998, 2003

He won the 1997 ASA British National 400 metres freestyle title and the seven ASA British National 1500 metres freestyle titles.

See also
 List of Commonwealth Games medallists in swimming (men)
 List of Olympic medalists in swimming (men)

References

British Swimming athlete profile

External links

1976 births
Living people
Scottish male freestyle swimmers
Olympic swimmers of Great Britain
Swimmers at the 1996 Summer Olympics
Swimmers at the 2004 Summer Olympics
Olympic bronze medallists for Great Britain
Scottish Olympic medallists
Alumni of the University of Manchester
Olympic bronze medalists in swimming
World Aquatics Championships medalists in swimming
Medalists at the FINA World Swimming Championships (25 m)
European Aquatics Championships medalists in swimming
People educated at Bramhall High School
Sportspeople from Falkirk
Medalists at the 1996 Summer Olympics
Commonwealth Games silver medallists for Scotland
Commonwealth Games bronze medallists for Scotland
Swimmers at the 1994 Commonwealth Games
Swimmers at the 1998 Commonwealth Games
Swimmers at the 2002 Commonwealth Games
Commonwealth Games medallists in swimming
Medallists at the 2002 Commonwealth Games